Native Speaker may refer to:

 Native Speaker (novel), a 1995 novel by Chang-Rae Lee
 Native Speaker (album), a 2011 album by Canadian band Braids
 Native speaker, a person using their first language or mother tongue